The Nihang are an armed Sikh order. They are also referred to as Akali (lit. "the eternal"). 
 Baba Binod Singh
 Akali Naina Singh
 Akali Phula Singh
 Akali Hanuman Singh
 Baba Darbara Singh
 Jathedar Baba Santa Singh Nihang
 Giani Gian Singh Nihang
 Akali Kaur Singh Nihang - 
 Akali Dharam Singh Nihang Singh - Nihang Author, Theologian and preacher 
 Jathedar Baba Chet Singh Nihang Singh - 12th Jathedar Budha Dal

References

Nihang